The following active airports serve the area around Bracebridge, Ontario, Canada:

See also 

 List of airports in the Fergus area
 List of airports in the London, Ontario area
 List of airports in the Ottawa area
 List of airports in the Parry Sound area
 List of airports in the Port Carling area
 List of airports in the Sault Ste. Marie, Ontario area
 List of airports in the Thunder Bay area
 List of airports in the Greater Toronto Area

References 

 
Bracebridge
Airports
Bracebridge
Airports